Refugees of the Heart is the sixth solo studio album by Steve Winwood, released in 1990. The album contained the hit single, "One and Only Man", which topped the Mainstream Rock Tracks chart and saw the return of former Traffic bandmate Jim Capaldi to Winwood's songwriting team. A Traffic reunion followed in 1994, and because of that collaboration, Winwood would not record another solo album until late 1997. "I Will Be Here" and "Another Deal Goes Down" were also released as singles.

Winwood stated about the closing track, “In The Light Of Day”: 'When Will and I wrote the song (..) it was our idea of what Nelson Mandela's dream was, while he was in prison. It was really just a fantasy of ours, but that’s what we based the song on.'

Track listing 
All songs written by Steve Winwood and Will Jennings except where noted.

 "You'll Keep on Searching" – 6:15
 "Every Day (Oh Lord)" – 5:44
 "One and Only Man" – (Steve Winwood, Jim Capaldi) 4:55
 "I Will Be Here" – 5:50
 "Another Deal Goes Down" – 4:55
 "Running On" – 4:15
 "Come Out and Dance" – 5:30
 "In the Light of Day" – 9:35

Non-album tracks
 Always (instrumental)
 In the Light of Day (instrumental version)

"Always" was the b-side to "One and Only Man", while the instrumental version of "In the Light of Day" was the b-side to "I Will Be Here". The instrumental version, an edit of the album version's backing track, runs for about 6 minutes and contains some improvisational work at the end not found on the album version.

Personnel 
 Steve Winwood – vocals, keyboards (1-6, 8), Hammond organ (1, 3-7), Minimoog solo (2), keyboard bass (3), guitar (3, 7), additional percussion (3), vibraphone solo (8), additional drums (8), keyboard programming, Fairlight programming, drum programming
 Mike Lawler – additional keyboards (1, 4)
 Anthony Crawford – guitar (1)
 Larry Byrom – guitar (2, 4, 6, 7), slide guitar (5)
 Michael Rhodes – bass guitar (1, 2, 4-7)
 Russ Kunkel – drums (1, 4, 5)
 Jim Capaldi – drums (2, 3, 7), percussion (3)
 Eddie Bayers – drums (6)
 Bashiri Johnson – percussion (1, 2, 4-8)
 Randall Bramblett – soprano saxophone (1), alto saxophone (7), tenor saxophone (8)
 Jim Horn – alto saxophone (4), baritone and tenor saxophones (7)
 Harvey Thomson – tenor saxophone (7)
 Michael Haynes – trumpet (7)

Production 
 Produced by Steve Winwood
 Executive Producer and Management – John Clarke
 Engineered and Mixed by Tom Lord-Alge
 Assistant Engineer – Brian Harding (Nashville)
 Additional Engineering – Mick Dolan
 Mastered by Ted Jensen at Sterling Sound (New York, NY).
 Art Direction – Jeffrey Kent Ayeroff and Melanie Nissen
 Design – Mike Fink
 Photography – Andrew and Stuart Douglas

Certifications

Charts

Weekly charts

Year-end charts

References

Steve Winwood albums
1990 albums
Albums produced by Steve Winwood
Virgin Records albums